Muchuu were an English brother and sister electro-pop duo from Herefordshire, England.

Muchuu started writing music in 2008. In 2010 they released their first album, Adventure We Go on Kii Records. In 2011 their second album, On Beyond, was released by Electric Treasure Records.

Radio play
Their songs have been played on BBC Radio Hereford & Worcester, Sunshine Radio, Radio 1 and BBC Radio 6 Music, as well as the Japanese station J-Wave. They were also invited to record a Maida Vale session.

Gigs
They have played at Bestival (Isle of Wight),  Jersey Live Music Festival 2010, Underage Festival (London), ‘HowTheLightGetsIn’ (Hay-on-Wye) and Norway. The band's music was used during Christmas 2010 for a television advertising campaign (Central TV) for the Bull Ring Shopping Centre in Birmingham.

References

English electro musicians